Daniel's tufted-tailed rat (Eliurus danieli)  is a species of rodent in the family Nesomyidae. It was discovered in 2003 in the Parc National de l’Isalo in south-central Madagascar. It is named for Daniel Rakotondravony, professor of animal biology at the University of Antananarivo, Madagascar.

Daniel's tufted-tailed rat first became known in 1995, when a specimen was found to belong to the majori-penicillatus complex. Molecular data suggested that Major's tufted-tailed rat (Eliurus majori) was a close relative; study of two more animals found in 2002 indicated that the two are different species.

Description
The guard hairs are dark brown to black and slightly longer than the cover hairs. The general dorsal colour of the animal is a brownish grey, with a plain grey face, forehead and limbs. There is a sharp line separating the upper parts from the underparts. and the latter are buffish white. The feet are white and there is a tuft of white hairs at the base of each claw.

A male specimen found in December 2002 was found to have scrotal testes with convoluted epididymis. This species has a notably rounded braincase, certainly in comparison with the Tsingy tufted-tailed rat (Eliurus antsingy).

References

Mammals described in 2007
Taxa named by Michael D. Carleton
Mammals of Madagascar
Eliurus